Apterona is a genus of moths belonging to the family Psychidae.

The genus was first described by Milliere in 1857.

The species of this genus are found in Europe and Northern America.

Species:
 Apterona crenulella (Bruand, 1853)

References

Psychidae
Psychidae genera